Juliusz Bardach (3 November 1914, in Odessa – 26 January 2010, in Warsaw) was a Polish legal historian. Professor of the University of Warsaw, member of the Polish Academy of Sciences. He specialized in the history of governance and law of Lithuania and Poland.

Military attaché in Moscow (1945–1947). He received his Ph.D. from the Jagiellonian University in 1948. He received Doctor honoris causa from the University of Łódź (1995), University of Warsaw (1996) and the University of Vilnius (1997). Bardach was a recipient of the Grand Cross of the Order of Polonia Restituta (2002) and the Officer's Cross of the Lithuanian Order of Merit (2006).

He is the older brother of surgeon and Gulag survivor Janusz Bardach, author of Man Is Wolf to Man.

Selected works
 Historia państwa i prawa Polski do połowy XV wieku (1957)
 Historia państwa i prawa polskiego (1976, with Bogusław Leśnodorski and Michał Pietrzak)
 Themis a Clio czyli Prawo a historia (2001)

 Dzieje Sejmu Polskiego (1993)
 O dawnej i niedawnej Litwie (1988)
 Historia ustroju i prawa polskiego (1993)
 O Rzeczpospolitą Obojga Narodów (1998)
 Statuty litewskie a prawo rzymskie (1999)
 W obiektywie nauki i w lustrze pamięci (o uczonych, pisarzach i politykach XIX i XX wieku) (2004)

Notes

Sources
  

1914 births
2010 deaths
20th-century Polish historians
Polish male non-fiction writers
Writers from Odesa
Lawyers from Warsaw
Jewish historians
Grand Crosses of the Order of Polonia Restituta
Officer's Crosses of the Order for Merits to Lithuania
Odesa Jews
Jagiellonian University alumni
Academic staff of the University of Warsaw

Polish military attachés